Louidor Labissiere is a Haitian former footballer who played as a forward.

Career 
Labissiere played with Aigle Noir AC in 1971 in the Ligue Haïtienne, and played seven seasons with the club. In 1978, he played abroad in the National Soccer League with the Ottawa Tigers. He made his debut for Ottawa on June 2, 1978 in a friendly match against Hibernian F.C.

International career 
He made his debut for the Haiti national football team on April 2, 1976 against Dominican Republic. He recorded his first goal against Netherlands Antilles in the 1977 CONCACAF Championship qualification, and in total he appeared in eight matches for Haiti.

References 

Living people
Association football forwards
Haiti international footballers
Haitian footballers
Aigle Noir AC players
Ligue Haïtienne players
Canadian National Soccer League players
Haitian expatriate sportspeople in Canada
Expatriate soccer players in Canada
Haitian expatriate footballers
Year of birth missing (living people)